Huy is a municipality in Belgium.

Huy or HUY may also refer to:

People

Given name 
 Huy (Egyptian name) or Hui, an ancient Egyptian name
 Huy of Champasak, King of Champasak 1826–1841
 Huy Du (1926–2006), Vietnamese composer

Surname 
 Bonnie Huy (1935–2013), American politician
 Wolf-Dietrich Huy (1917–2003), German flying ace

Places
 Arrondissement of Huy, in Belgium
 Huy (hills), in Saxony-Anhalt, Germany
 Huy, Germany, a municipality in Saxony-Anhalt

Other uses
 Hulaulá language, a modern Jewish Aramaic language
 Humberside Airport, in England
 Huyton railway station, in England

See also
 Hui (disambiguation)